The Nepal women's cricket team toured Qatar in November 2021 to play a three-match bilateral Women's Twenty20 International (WT20I) series. The venue for the series was the West End Park International Cricket Stadium in Doha. These matches provided part of Nepal's preparation for the 2021 ICC Women's T20 World Cup Asia Qualifier. Nepal won the first two matches, winning the series with a game to spare. Nepal won the final match by 109 runs to win the series 3–0.

Squads

WT20I series

1st WT20I

2nd WT20I

3rd WT20I

References

External links
 Series home at ESPNcricinfo

Nepalese cricket tours abroad
2021 in Nepalese cricket
Associate international cricket competitions in 2021–22